USS Yorktown may refer to the following ships of the United States Navy:

 , a 16-gun sloop-of-war commissioned in 1840 (sunk in 1850)
 , the lead  commissioned in 1889 (sold in 1921)
 , the lead  commissioned in 1937 (sunk in 1942)
 , an  commissioned in 1943 (museum ship since 1975)
 , a  commissioned in 1984 (Undergoing scrapping)

United States Navy ship names